Portland Municipal Airport  is a city-owned, public-use airport located three nautical miles (6 km) northeast of the central business district of Portland, a city in Sumner County, Tennessee, United States. It is included in the National Plan of Integrated Airport Systems for 2011–2015, which categorized it as a general aviation facility.

Facilities and aircraft 
Portland Municipal Airport covers an area of 157 acres (64 ha) at an elevation of 817 feet (249 m) above mean sea level. It has one runway designated 1/19 with an asphalt surface measuring 5,000 by 100 feet (1,524 x 30 m).

For the 12-month period ending May 31, 2012, the airport had 12,080 aircraft operations, an average of 33 per day: 96% general aviation, 3% military, and 1% air taxi. At that time there were 12 aircraft based at this airport: 92% single-engine and 8% multi-engine.

References

External links 
 Portland Municipal (1M5) at Tennessee DOT Airport Directory
 Aerial image as of March 1997 from USGS The National Map
 
 

Airports in Tennessee
Transportation in Sumner County, Tennessee
Buildings and structures in Sumner County, Tennessee